Portia Johnson McGee ( Johnson, born March 9, 1979) is an American rower. She has won medals at two World Rowing Championships. Together with Anna Mickelson, she competed in the women's coxless pair where they came seventh.

McGee resides in Providence, Rhode Island. She attended The Bush School in Seattle, Washington.

References

1979 births
Living people
American female rowers
Olympic rowers of the United States
Rowers at the 2008 Summer Olympics
Sportspeople from Providence, Rhode Island
World Rowing Championships medalists for the United States
21st-century American women